Murray Harris may refer to:

 Murray J. Harris (born 1939), professor of New Testament exegesis and theology
 Murray M. Harris (1866–1922), American organ builder